The Al-Qādisiyyah governorate election of 2009 was held on 31 January 2009 alongside elections for all other governorates outside Iraqi Kurdistan and Kirkuk.

Results 

|- style="background-color:#E9E9E9"
! style=";text-align:left;vertical-align:top;" colspan=2 |Coalition !! Allied national parties !! Seats (2005) !! Seats (2009) !! Change  !! Votes
|-
| style="background-color:#FF0000;" |
| style="text-align:left;" | State of Law Coalition / IDP || style="text-align:left;" | Islamic Dawa PartyIslamic Dawa Party - Iraq Organisation || 5 || 11 || 6 || 78,276
|-
| style="background-color:#009933;" |
| style="text-align:left;" | Al Mihrab Martyr List /  Martyr of the Sanctuary Sayyid Muhammad Baqir al-Hakim|| style="text-align:left;" | Islamic Supreme Council of Iraq || 20 || 5 || 15 || 38,972
|-
| style="background-color:#098DCD;" |
| style="text-align:left;" | Iraqi National List || || 3 || 3 || - || 27,687
|-
| style="background-color:#FF0000;" |
| style="text-align:left;" | National Reform Trend || || - || 3 || 3 || 26,738
|-
| style="background-color:#000000;" |
| style="text-align:left;" | Independent Free Movement List || style="text-align:left;" |Sadrist Movement|| 3|| 2 || 1|| 21,742
|-
| style="background-color:#000000;" |
| style="text-align:left;" | Islamic Loyalty Party || style="text-align:left;" |Sadrist Movement || 2 || 2 || - || 14,054
|-
| style="background-color:#2929FD;" |
| style="text-align:left;" | Islamic Virtue Party || || 3|| 2 || 1 || 13,596
|-
|
| style="text-align:left;" | Shiite Political Council || || 5 || - || 5 ||
|-
| style="text-align:left;" colspan=3 | Total || 41 || 28 || 13 || 332,176
|-
| colspan=6 style="text-align:left;" |Sources: this article - 
|}

References 

2009 Iraqi governorate elections